The following is a list of Serbian basketball coaches who have been assistant or head coaches in the National Basketball Association (NBA).

In 2000, Igor Kokoškov became the first non-American to hold a full-time assistant coach position in the NBA. In 2004, he became the first non-American assistant coach to win an NBA championship, and in 2006, he became the first to serve on an NBA All-Star Game coaching staff. In 2018, he became the first fully European head coach in the NBA.

In 2004, Igor Kokoškov won the NBA championship as an assistant coach of the Detroit Pistons. Since then, Dejan Milojević won the league in 2022 as an assistant coach of the Golden State Warriors.

Key 

Serbian coaches

Coaches with Serbian citizenship or parentage
The following is a list of coaches, who are or have been assistant or head coaches in NBA, who have citizenship of Serbia or Serbian parentage or who are Serbs of former Yugoslav republics (Bosnia and Herzegovina, Croatia, Montenegro, North Macedonia, Slovenia).

See also
 List of foreign NBA coaches
 List of Serbian NBA players
 List of Serbian WNBA players

Notes
Details

Other nationalities, ethnic groups, native-language

References

Serbian
Serbian